LouAnn Gerken (born May 20, 1959) is a Professor of Psychology, Linguistics, and Cognitive Science at the University of Arizona. She is the author of a book on language development and has over 80 published articles and book chapters on the topic. Her education includes a B.A. in Psychology (University of Rochester, 1981), an M.A. in Experimental Psychology (Columbia University, 1983), and a Ph.D. in Experimental Psychology (Columbia University, 1987).

Book
 Language Development

References

External links
 Official Homepage at the University of Arizona
 
 LouAnn Gerken: The Making of a Mind

1959 births
Living people
Linguists from the United States
Teachers College, Columbia University alumni
University of Rochester alumni
University of Arizona faculty
Women linguists
Women cognitive scientists
Developmental psycholinguists